Anatoly Donika (born 20 June 1960) is a Russian former professional ice hockey defenceman who was a long-time member of the Sokil Kyiv in the Russian Superleague.

References

External links 

1960 births
Living people
HC Neftekhimik Nizhnekamsk players
Russian ice hockey defencemen
Sokil Kyiv players
Sportspeople from Krasnoyarsk